Gerasimos Vlachos (1607–1685) was a Greek scholar of the Renaissance.

He was born in Heraklion, Crete but migrated to Venice early on and was a student and associate of fellow Greek scholar Theophilos Korydaleus. He specialised in Greek philosophy and among his many writings was The Definitive Harmony of Things According to Greek Thinkers (Venice 1661).

Known works
 The Definitive Harmony of Things According to Greek Thinkers

See also
 Greek scholars in the Renaissance

References

1607 births
1685 deaths
Greek Renaissance humanists
Writers from Heraklion
17th-century Greek writers
17th-century Greek educators